José Manuel Arias Copete (born 10 October 1999) is a Spanish footballer who plays as a central defender for RCD Mallorca.

Club career
Born in Écija, Seville, Andalusia, Copete was an Écija Balompié youth graduate. He made his first team debut at the age of just 16 on 19 March 2016, coming on as a late substitute in a 2–0 Tercera División away win against CD Cabecense.

Copete featured sparingly for the Azulinos afterwards, contributing with seven appearances during the 2016–17 campaign as his side achieved promotion to Segunda División B. On 4 January 2018, he moved to Córdoba CF until the end of the season, and featured for the reserves in the fourth division.

On 7 June 2018, Copete signed a three-year contract with Villarreal CF, being initially assigned to the C-team also in the fourth tier. On 22 July of the following year, he was loaned to third division side SCR Peña Deportiva for one year, and upon returning in July 2020, he played for the B-side in the same category.

On 17 June 2021, Copete agreed to a one-year deal with Segunda División side SD Ponferradina. He made his professional debut on 14 August, starting in a 1–0 home win over AD Alcorcón.

On 29 June 2022, Copete signed a four-year contract with RCD Mallorca in La Liga.

References

External links
 Profile at the RCD Mallorca website

1999 births
Living people
People from Écija
Sportspeople from the Province of Seville
Spanish footballers
Footballers from Andalusia
Association football defenders
Segunda División players
Segunda División B players
Tercera División players
Écija Balompié players
Córdoba CF B players
Villarreal CF C players
SCR Peña Deportiva players
Villarreal CF B players
SD Ponferradina players
RCD Mallorca players